Yvonne van Dorp (born 6 January 1966) is a retired Dutch sprinter and long jumper. She won several national titles in sprinting and one in the long jump. At the 1988 Summer Olympics, she reached the quarter finals in the women's 400 m.  she is the last Dutch woman to have qualified in the 400 m event at the Summer Olympics.

Career

Sprinting
As a sprinter, van Dorp reached the semifinals of the European Athletics Junior Championships in the 200 m in 1983, and as an adult won multiple Netherlands Championships, both Outdoor and Indoor.

Outdoor

Indoor

At the 1988 Summer Olympics in Seoul, she qualified for the quarter final with a personal best time of 52.84 but did not progress. She was not selected for the 1992 Summer Olympics.

Long jump
In 1993, van Dorp won the national indoor championship in the long jump.

References

External links

IAAF Profile
Leidse Olympiërs

1966 births
Living people
Athletes (track and field) at the 1988 Summer Olympics
Dutch female long jumpers
Dutch female sprinters
Olympic athletes of the Netherlands
Sportspeople from Leiden
20th-century Dutch women